Laudakia nuristanica, also known as Leviton's rock agama, is a species of agamid lizard. It is found in eastern Afghanistan and northwestern Pakistan.

References

Laudakia
Lizards of Asia
Reptiles of Afghanistan
Reptiles of Pakistan
Reptiles described in 1969
Taxa named by Steven C. Anderson
Taxa named by Alan E. Leviton